Tilicho Peak is a mountain in the Nepalese Himalaya, near Annapurna. The peak was first seen by Europeans in 1950 by members of the 1950 French Annapurna expedition led by Maurice Herzog who were attempting to find Annapurna I.

Lake Tilicho is located on the northern side of the peak.

The first ascent was made in 1978 by the French climber Emanuel Schmutz using the northwest shoulder. In 1982 a winter ascent was made by Ang Serky, Dawa Gyalzen and Serky Tshering in what anthropologist Sherry Ortner believes to be the first all-Sherpa mountaineering expedition.

References

External links
 "Tilicho, Nepal" on Peakbagger

Mountains of the Gandaki Province
Seven-thousanders of the Himalayas